There have been at least two ships of the Royal Navy named HMS Privet:

 , built as the merchantman Island Queen in 1916 and taken up a Q-ship during  World War I.

Royal Navy ship names